The Brittle Bone Society is the only UK wide charity dedicated to providing support to people affected by osteogenesis Imperfecta (OI).

Background
The Brittle Bone Society was established in 1968 in Dundee by Margaret Grant, who has OI. When she was young, Grant was aware that there was virtually no support for people with OI and that many medical professionals knew little or nothing about the condition. When her daughter Yvonne was born some years later, very little had changed. For many years Grant was the driving force of the society, which was recognised when she was awarded an MBE in 1989, and again in 2018 when she was awarded an honorary degree from the University of Dundee.

The society now has more than 1,000 members and works closely with specialist medical units and other professionals throughout the UK. Its current chief executive is Patricia Osborne.

The society's archives, which include about thirty boxes of material, are held by the University of Dundee.

Footnotes

External links
 

Health charities in the United Kingdom
Organisations based in Dundee
Orthopedic organizations
Charities based in Scotland
Medical and health organisations based in Scotland